Chuck Gavin (December 26, 1933 – December 1, 2012) was an American football defensive end. He played for the Denver Broncos from 1960 to 1963.

He died on December 1, 2012, in Denver, Colorado at age 78.

References

1933 births
2012 deaths
American football defensive ends
Tennessee State Tigers football players
BC Lions players
Denver Broncos players